"Replacements" is a short story  by American writer Lisa Tuttle. It concerns a husband's surfacing insecurities as his wife's independence strengthens when she claims a bloodsucking pet for her very own.

Tuttle declared in an interview with M. M. Hall from Fantastic Metropolis: "My first post-natal story to deal with in any way with motherhood was “Replacements”, written when my daughter was only seven months old. Make of that what you will…".

"Replacements" has been widely reprinted since being first published in 1992, both in Tuttle's own short story collections and various writers anthologies. It was also included on various "best of" anthologies in the year.

Summary 
As Stuart commences his walk to work, he notices  an animal "about the size of a cat, naked looking, with leathery, hairless skin and thin, spiky limbs that seemed too frail to support the bulbous, ill-proportioned body." Disgusted and horrified by the appearance of this animal, he crushes it with his foot. Immediately,  he is remorseful, and his first instinct is to call his wife, Jenny. Since he is not sure what her reaction will be, he waits to call her at the normal time in the afternoon. She is not able to take his call and does not return the call either. Stuart calls again, only to find that she has left work early. This, being unlike her, worries Stuart, and he returns home as soon as possible.

Once home, he finds that Jenny brought one of the "creatures" with her. Stuart shows strong dislike towards the creature and wants Jenny to get rid of it. The two argue about what to do with Jenny's new "pet" but never come to a resolution. The creature begins taking up more of Jenny's time and attention. She also does abnormal activities with the creature (letting it drink blood from her). As this progresses, Stuart is regarded less and less and becomes very distanced from Jenny. Eventually, Jenny says that she is going to keep it whether Stuart likes it or not. Stuart then decides that he cannot live with the creature and the woman Jenny has become, and he moves out.

He begins to notice these creatures more and more. The women at work, women on the streets – every woman he sees seems to have one of these creatures. One evening, while on his way home from work, he notices a woman sitting opposite with a gold chain that brings back memories. After leaving the train at the same stop as the woman, he strives to come up with something to say, but he sees the chain linked to one of the "pets" he despises and immediately lets her walk away. He absentmindedly walks to his old house, where he sees Jenny's creature longing to be outside and he longing to be in.

Adaptations
The story was adapted for the 12th episode of The Hunger season 2, also titled "Replacements" (28 November 1999).

References

External links 
 Lisa Tuttle at Random House
 Celestial Timepiece - A Joyce Carol Oates Home Page - American Gothic Tales

American short stories
Feminist literature
1992 short stories
Gothic short stories
Science fiction short stories